Wild Wild Racing is an off-road racing game created exclusively for the PlayStation 2 by Rage Software Limited.

Summary
It was one of the first games released on the PlayStation 2 and was released on the same day as the console in the US and Europe on October 26, 2000, and November 24, 2000, respectively. Wild Wild Racing allows players to compete in all-terrain vehicle races in various countries around the globe. There are five locations in the game: United States, India, Iceland, Mexico and Australia.

In addition to the off-road racing circuits, Wild Wild Racing includes a series of mini-games that allow the player to upgrade and access new vehicles. These challenges are one of three different types; Quest (find the letters that spell out the name of the next unlockable car around the track), Skill (use your car to push a large ball through a crazy golf style course to the finish line), and Stunt (complete an extreme stunt course including jumps over a series of objects etc.).

Wild Wild Racing was released in all three major territories: Japan, the US and Europe.

Development
The game was developed in 15 months with a budget of £400,000

Reception

The game received "mixed" reviews according to the review aggregation website Metacritic. David Chen of NextGen said, "Next-generation consoles deserve next-generation racers, and while Wild Wild Racing is an enjoyable ride, it doesn't make much of the new hardware." In Japan, Famitsu gave it a score of 29 out of 40.

Notes

References

External links
 

2000 video games
Imagineer games
Interplay Entertainment games
PlayStation 2 games
PlayStation 2-only games
Off-road racing video games
Rage Games games
Video games developed in the United Kingdom
Multiplayer and single-player video games